Our Lady of Lourdes Church (also known as Our Lady—Chapel of Lourdes) is a Roman Catholic church in the Diocese of Chengdu, situated on Yuquan Road, at the foot of the Xishan (West Hill) Park in Fucheng District, Mianyang, China. Mary Zhang Yimei, a resident nun, is in charge of the church's daily affairs.

Architecture 

Our Lady of Lourdes is a humble church built in white brick of the neo-Gothic style. Inside, the plan is that of a nave and two aisles on either side. The interior walls are simply whitewashed. Behind the altar is a white statue of the Virgin Mary with orange halo placed in a niche. A Lourdes grotto is located in the church courtyard, but strangely, the statue within the cave depicts the Immaculate Heart of Mary as described by Lúcia of Fátima.

Church activities 
A pedagogical training course is held in the church every summer, targeting children and teenagers aged 7–18; as well as some missionary training courses being occasionally conducted by the church. Teachers from Hong Kong have also been invited to give lectures on marriage, family and children's education.

During the 2008 Sichuan earthquake, a transportation of grain and oil was carried out by the parish priest Zhong Cheng, along with Mary Zhang Yimei, another resident nun Zhan Dengju, and several Catholic volunteers. With three cars and a lorry, they passed through military and police checkpoints and reached the blocked area in Beichuan County to help the victims.

Gallery

See also 
 Lucy Yi Zhenmei
 Gospel Church, Mianyang
 Catholic Church in Sichuan
 Cathedral of the Immaculate Conception, Chengdu

References 

Churches in Mianyang
Mianyang
Roman Catholic chapels in China
Mianyang